Ponnar Shankar is a historical story (990–1020 CE) as part of the post-Sangam history of the Tamil country. This period saw the rise and fall of many kingdoms, some of which were empires that exerted influence far and wide. 

It is also named as a source of their cultural materials and traditions, transmitted orally from one generation to another either by messages or testimony or speech or song or street theatre and many other forms.

The Story

The tale is a story of two brothers, known as Ponnar also known as Periya Annan (elder brother) and Shankar also known as Chinna Annan (younger brother), revered as the Annanmar Swami.The story has been recited and passed on as a folk tale through many generations in very rustic traditions as songs which were known as gramiya padalgal (folk songs) and have been enacted as folk entertainment through street theater which were known as Therru Koothu.

The Ponnar-Sankar story starts from their grandfathers. The chieftain of the Vazhavanthi country in Chera kingdom (part of Southern Namakkal district) was Kolaththa Gounder, eldest among the twelve brothers. Kolaththa Gounder and his wife Ariyanaachi decide to leave their country Perungudi because of atrocities of his unjust brothers. They go to Mathukkarai to Goddess Sellandiya Amman temple.

In the temple, they find the three great kings, Chera King, Chola King and Pandya King, sitting in front of the goddess and re-drawing their disputed tri-nation borders as process to bring lasting peace and stability. They are in a conundrum and cannot agree on borders. Kolaththa Gounder finds a solution that is agreeable to all the three kings and resolves the dispute fairly. Impressed with this skill and solution, the Chola King gifts him the lordship to sizeable territory which back in the day could be akin to a size of a small country. The granted gift was called Konad.
 
The couple went to Konadu and founded the initial settlements. The area was a vast wasteland but with their hard work and dedication they developed these wastelands into cultivable farm lands. With their ingenuity they had devised and laid out an extensive system of ponds and shallow pits and lakes which acted as catchment zones and increased the fertility of the lands which in turn made it more cultivable and fertile. Their efforts over time paid off, making the country prosperous. After a while the erstwhile Konad was renamed as Valanadu (Trichy District), also known as Ponni Valanadu.

Meanwhile, Kolaththa Gounder’s brothers, who remained in Vazhavanthi country, faced severe droughts successively and reached out to seek refuge with their eldest brother, who was now the chieftain of Konadu. The eldest brother, as a brave Kongan, gave refuge to his eleven brothers within the borders of his country.

Kolaththa Gounder and Ariyanaachi were living a prosperous life, but they were unhappy that did not have a child to continue their lineage. So the couple sort divine grace to alleviate their unhappiness and made several temple visits far and near asking the great lord to bless with them children. After a long penance, they were blessed with a son whom they named Kunnudaiya Gounder (later called as Kunnudaiya).

Kunnudaiya Gounder, as the boy, was sluggish and naive. Unfortunately for him, his parents died of natural causes, leaving the five-year-old to fend for himself. After the death of Kolaththa Gounder and Ariyanaachi , the 11 brothers, already jealous of the prosperity and abundance, found an opportune moment to usurp their dead brother’s wealth and kingdom.

The eleven brothers colluded and drove the young Kunnudaiya Gounder out of Valanadu. As a young child he managed to wander his way into Aathi Chetti palayam (now near Puliyur, Karur district). He went to the home of a Chettiyar (Merchant) who traded rice bran. The chettiyar, a kind man, took young Mannudaiya Gounder into his house and sheltered him. Happenstance, after the arrival of KunnudaiyaGounder, the Chettiyar’s luck improved and he becomes very prosperous.

Kunnudaiyar married Thaamarai Nachiyar and had sons Ponnar and Shankar. They also had a daughter, 'Arukaani Thangam'. Both ruled Ponni Valanadu and today. (Veerappur is a historic place region.)

Geographical Location
Although there is now no official geographic area called Kongu Nadu, it covers the districts of Coimbatore, Karur, Erode, Salem, Tirupur, Namakkal,  Dharmapuri, in Tamil Nadu, India.

References

Indian folklore